John Parish is a British musician and producer.

John Parish may also refer to:
John Parish (footballer) (1875–1944), Australian rules footballer
John Carl Parish (1881–1939), American historian
John Cook Parish, notable of the Boy Scouts of America 
John Felton Parish (1933–1982), American spree killer
John K. Parish (1848–1932), American jurist and politician

See also
John Parrish (disambiguation)